Follow the Lights (released in the UK as Everybody Knows) is an EP by Ryan Adams and The Cardinals released on October 23, 2007. The EP contains three new songs and four live studio recordings, including a cover of the Alice in Chains' song, "Down in a Hole". It was produced by then-Cardinals member James Candiloro.

The EP includes a re-recorded version of the song "Blue Hotel", which originally appeared on Willie Nelson's Songbird album. "This Is It" was previously recorded for Rock n Roll, "If I Am a Stranger" for Cold Roses and "Dear John" – which was co-written by Ryan Adams and Norah Jones – for Jacksonville City Nights.

In its first week, Follow the Lights sold about 19,000 copies and entered the US Billboard 200 chart at number 40.

In the UK, Follow the Lights was released as Everybody Knows, with the titular "Everybody Knows" from Easy Tiger included as an extra track. In Germany, the EP is not available individually, but was added as a bonus disc to a limited edition reissue of Easy Tiger.

The album cover is a photograph taken by the guitarist Neal Casal.

Track listing

Personnel 
Ryan Adams — guitars, piano, banjo, vocals
Brad Pemberton — drums, percussion
Chris Feinstein — bass guitar
Jon Graboff — pedal steel, vocals
Neal Casal — guitars, vocals, cover photograph
James Candiloro — piano, keyboards, producer, recording ("Follow the Lights" and "My Love for You is Real"), mixing
Jason Wormer — recording
Clifton Aleen — recording assistant
Brendan Dekora — mixing assistant
Bob Ludwig — mastering
Philip Andelman — live photograph
Andy West — design

References 

Ryan Adams albums
2007 EPs
Lost Highway Records EPs